John Raymond Jones (November 19, 1899 – June 9, 1991) was the last Grand Sachem of Tammany Hall, a New York City Councilman for Harlem, a district leader, ran the Carver Democratic Club, and was Adam Clayton Powell's campaign manager in 1958, opposing Tammany Hall, and Carmine DeSapio.

Early life
Jones was born on November 19, 1899, in St. Thomas, Danish West Indies. He moved to New York City in 1917 and became involved with politics, serving as an election inspector in 1921. His focus was on registering and organizing African American voters in the Harlem area, and placing black officials in the court system. Jones worked on the John Francis Hylan campaign for mayor in 1921 and was enthused by his proposal to keep the 5 cent fare. However, Hylan did not reward Jones's effort. As a result, Jones formed a political club to help create political room for African Americans. "Ray worked on a coal barge, and I carried ice...Your only hope was to get in with the right white person because they had it all. White political leaders ran the old Chicopee Club on St. Nicholas Avenue."

Rise to power
In 1944, Jones was elected as leader for Assembly District 13. He then worked closely with Mayor William O'Dwyer, eventually becoming deputy commissioner for Housing & Buildings. In 1956, Adam Clayton Powell Jr. endorsed Eisenhower over Stevenson. This was a break with Tammany and the Democratic machine. The machine put up a candidate in the primary, Earl Brown. Jones ran Powell's campaign, easily beating Brown and demonstrating to Tammany they had no power in Harlem. Jones and Powell took this relationship, which had been formed over years, to the 1960 Democratic convention. There, they supported Lyndon Johnson on the first ballot. This was a political deal with Speaker of the House Sam Rayburn. Rayburn would place Powell as chairman of the Education and Labor Committee. In this role, Powell passed some of the most landmark legislation during the Kennedy and Johnson administrations. However, Jones paid a political price. He challenged Tammany leader Carmine DeSapio twice, succeeding in 1964 in becoming Tammany's first black leader, and its last leader after Robert F. Kennedy, and the Reformers came after him.

Grand Sachem of Tammany Hall

Jones ran Tammany Hall from 1964 to 1967 but he had forces to contend with. Robert Kennedy had a grudge against him. During Kennedy's tenure as United States Senator from New York, he did everything he could to take down the prominent Black political leader. However, because of his relationship with Johnson, Jones was able to help Constance Baker Motley to become the first African American woman on the federal bench, and was also able to convince Johnson to create the United States Department of Housing and Urban Development and make Robert Clifton Weaver its secretary. Weaver, after LBJ appointed him, became the first Black Cabinet member. Jones shrewd political maneuvering paved the way for many judicial and legislative achievements.  In 1961, Jones supported the election of Robert F. Wagner Jr. as mayor of New York City for a third term, breaking with Tammany Hall. In 1963, Jones became leader of the 21st Council District, and eventually took his place on the City Council when he foresaw the dissolution of Tammany Hall and the rise of Reformism.  Jones supported Paul R. Screvane in the 1965 Democratic mayoral primary, and then endorsed John Lindsay in 1969. Jones was also part of the coalition that helped make Bertram L. Baker the first African American majority whip of the New York State Assembly. At that time, it was the highest elected office African Americans had obtained in New York State.

Old timer Stanley Ferris observed glumly, "Harlem hasn't voted Republican in 30 years. And this was our reward (Jones ousted). Black leaders get discouraged. You work hard, deliver the vote, get a little power, and they pull you down. I don't know, maybe if Kennedy would adopt some Negro leader and boost him up, we might get some initiative back."

Political legacy
Jones also served as a mentor to many younger black politicians who later became prominent in New York politics. This group became known as the "Harlem Clubhouse". The most prominent members of this group were David Dinkins, Basil Paterson (father of later Governor David), Charles Rangel, and Percy Sutton.

Known as "The Fox," Jones was leader of Harlem's Carver Democratic Club. New York City Mayor David N. Dinkins said about Jones, "Without his counsel and guidance, Percy Sutton, Constance Baker Motley, Fritz W. Alexander II, Edward R. Dudley, Charlie Rangel, Robert Clifton Weaver, and I might add, David N. Dinkins, would not have achieved as much. He was a true political pioneer and a deeply committed individual who dedicated his life to serving the people of New York."
In 1970, he moved back to St. Thomas, but returned to New York City in 1990.
He was living at the Greater Harlem Nursing Home. He died on June 9, 1991, at the North General Hospital in Manhattan at 91 years of age.

Further reading
John C. Walker,The Harlem Fox: J. Raymond Jones at Tammany 1920:1970, New York: State University  New York Press, 1989.
Paterson, David Black, Blind, & In Charge: A Story of Visionary Leadership and Overcoming Adversity. New York, New York, 2020
David N. Dinkins, A Mayor's Life: Governing New York's Gorgeous Mosaic, PublicAffairs Books, 2013
Rangel, Charles B.; Wynter, Leon (2007). And I Haven't Had a Bad Day Since: From the Streets of Harlem to the Halls of Congress. New York: St. Martin's Press.
Baker Motley, Constance Equal Justice Under The Law: An Autobiography, New York: Farrar, Straus, and Giroux, 1998.
Howell, Ron Boss of Black Brooklyn: The Life and Times of Bertram L. Baker  Fordham University Press Bronx, New York 2018
Jack, Hulan Fifty Years a Democrat:The Autobiography of Hulan Jack New Benjamin Franklin House New York, NY 1983
Clayton-Powell, Adam Adam by Adam:The Autobiography of Adam Clayton Powell Jr. New York, New York 1972
Pritchett, Wendell E. Robert Clifton Weaver and the American City: The Life and Times of an Urban Reformer Chicago: University of Chicago Press 2008
Davis, Benjamin Communist Councilman from Harlem:Autobiographical Notes Written in a Federal Penitentiary New York, New York 1969

References 

1899 births
1991 deaths
People from Harlem
Leaders of Tammany Hall
New York (state) Democrats
New York City Council members
County executives in New York (state)
People from Saint Thomas, U.S. Virgin Islands
20th-century American politicians
American Book Award winners
David Paterson
Political history of New York City
American political bosses from New York (state)